The 2017–18 Tampa Bay Lightning season was the 26th season for the National Hockey League (NHL) franchise that was established on December 16, 1991.

Off-season

April
On April 9, 2017, the Lightning's 2016–17 season came to an end when they defeated the Buffalo Sabres 4–2 at Amalie Arena. The Lightning were eliminated from playoff contention the night before when the Toronto Maple Leafs defeated the Pittsburgh Penguins 5–3.

On April 23, 2017, the Lightning signed Boris Katchouk to a three-year, entry-level contract. Katchouk posted career highs in goals (35), assists (29) and points (64). Katchouk said he had "dreamed of this for a long time" after signing the contract. Katchouk joined the Syracuse Crunch of the American Hockey League (AHL) after the Sault Ste. Marie Greyhounds were eliminated from the Ontario Hockey League (OHL) playoffs.

On April 25, 2017, Tanner Richard left the Syracuse Crunch to join the Switzerland men's national ice hockey team to try to earn a spot for the 2017 IIHF World Championship. It was unknown at the time whether Richard would rejoin the Crunch if the team remained in the playoffs.

On April 28, 2017, Richard agreed to a two-year contract with Genève-Servette HC of the Swiss National League A (NLA).

May
On May 15, 2017, the Lightning announced it had signed Taylor Raddysh to a three-year, entry-level contract. Raddysh led the OHL's Erie Otters offense the past season with 109 points in 58 games.

On May 29, 2017, the NHL announced the Lightning would host the 2018 NHL All-Star Game at Amalie Arena. The Lightning had previously served as host of the NHL All-Star game back in 1999, which notably featured Wayne Gretzky's final appearance in an NHL All-Star Game.

On May 31, 2017, the Lightning announced it had traded Bokondji Imama to the Los Angeles Kings in exchange for a conditional seventh-round pick in the 2018 NHL Entry Draft. For the condition to be satisfied, the Kings had to sign Imama to an NHL contract before the June 1, 2pm deadline. The Kings satisfied the requirements of the conditional seventh-round pick when it signed Imama to a three-year, entry-level contract.

June
On June 15, 2017, the Lightning announced a blockbuster trade that sent forward Jonathan Drouin to the Montreal Canadiens and a conditional sixth-round pick in the 2018 NHL Entry Draft in exchange for defenseman Mikhail Sergachev and a conditional second-round pick in the 2018 Draft. In 2016–17, Sergachev played in 50 games with the OHL's Windsor Spitfires, recording 10 goals and 43 points. Sergachev also helped Windsor capture the 2017 Memorial Cup as Canadian Hockey League (CHL) champions.

On June 18, 2017, the Lightning announced its list of protected players for the 2017 NHL Expansion Draft. The Lightning chose to protect forwards Steven Stamkos, Nikita Kucherov, Ryan Callahan, Tyler Johnson, Ondrej Palat, Alex Killorn, Vladislav Namestnikov; defensemen Victor Hedman, Anton Stralman and Braydon Coburn; and goaltender Andrei Vasilevskiy. Vegas was permitted to negotiate with any unprotected players until June 21. If a player was signed, then it counted as Vegas' expansion draft pick. Barring any trades, Vegas would create its inaugural roster by selecting one player from every NHL club.

On June 19, 2017, Jokerit of the Kontinental Hockey League (KHL) announced it had signed Lightning forward prospect Henri Ikonen to a two-year contract.

On June 20, 2017, Lausanne HC of the NLA announced it had signed Lightning prospect Joel Vermin to a five-year contract that contains an NHL clause for a one-way deal. The deal had been previously reported in January, however the terms of the deal and which club had signed him was unknown. Vermin has played in 24 NHL games and recorded four assists. He has primarily played in the AHL, where he has made 185 appearances, scoring 44 goals and 55 assists.

On June 21, 2017, the Vegas Golden Knights selected Lightning defensemen Jason Garrison in the 2017 NHL Expansion Draft. In order to facilitate Vegas selecting Garrison, the Lightning traded prospect Nikita Gusev, a second-round pick in the 2017 NHL Entry Draft and a fourth-round pick in the 2018 Draft. In so doing, the Lightning were also able to protect defensive prospects Jake Dotchin and Slater Koekkoek. The selection of Garrison also freed up $4.6 million in salary cap for the 2017–18 season.

On June 22, 2017, it was leaked by the media that the Lightning were re-signing goaltender Peter Budaj to a two-year contract extension. Budaj joined the Lightning as part of the trade that sent Lightning starting goaltender Ben Bishop to the Los Angeles Kings (along with a fifth-round pick in the 2017 NHL Entry Draft) in exchange for prospect Erik Cernak, a seventh-round pick in 2017 and a conditional pick in 2017.

On June 25, 2017, the Lightning announced the schedule and tentative roster for their annual developmental cap at The Ice Sports Forum. The camp will feature some of the Lightning's top prospects, along with the 2017 Draftees and invitees. Notable prospects attending this year includes Mikhail Sergachev, Brett Howden, Anthony Cirelli, Mathieu Joseph, Taylor Raddysh and Conner Ingram. Also in attendance will be all six players selected at the 2017 NHL Entry Draft, including first round pick Callan Foote.

On June 26, 2017, the Lightning announced it had re-signed defenseman Andrej Sustr to a one-year, $1.95 million contract. Sustr skated in 80 games last season, recording 14 points.

Shortly after Sustr's extension was announced by the Lightning, the team announced it had re-signed forward Yanni Gourde to a two-year, $1 million contract extension. Gourde made 20 appearances in 2016–17, scoring six goals.

Later in the afternoon, the Lightning announced it had issued qualifying offers to nine players: Michael Bournival, Jake Dotchin, Kristers Gudlevskis, Tyler Johnson, Tye McGinn, Ondrej Palat, Matthew Peca and Tanner Richard. In so doing, the Lightning retained the rights to these players. Notable players not being issued qualifying offers by the Lightning were prospects Dylan Blujus, Jonathan Racine and Henri Ikonen. Any player not tenured a qualifying offer became an unrestricted free agent.

On June 28, 2017, the Lightning announced it had re-signed forward Cory Conacher to a two-year, $1.3 million contract extension. Conacher appeared in 11 games in 2016–17 with the Lightning, recording a goal and three assists. Conacher predominately played for the Crunch this past season. In his stint with the Crunch, Conacher recorded 17 goals and 43 assists. Additionally, Conacher led all players in scoring in the 2017 Calder Cup playoffs with 12 goals and 28 points.

A short time after the announcement of Conacher being re-signed, the Lightning announced it had re-signed Gabriel Dumont to a two-year, $1.3 million contract extension. Dumont appeared in 39 games with the Lightning in 2016–17, recording two goals and two assists. In the AHL, Dumont played in 20 games with the Crunch, scoring five goals and five assists. Additionally, Dumont appeared in all 22 playoffs games with the Crunch, where he recorded 5 goals and 11 points.

On June 29, 2017, the Lightning announced a massive $6 million renovation to The Ice Sports Forum. The Ice Sports Forum owner Tom Bradley will also be contributing $500,000 to the project. As part of the expansion, the Lightning extended their lease for another ten years. The renovation will increase the size of the facility from roughly 14,500 square feet to 18,000 square feet.

Later that afternoon, the Lightning announced the signing of forward prospect Alexander Volkov to a three-year, entry-level contract. Volkov played for SKA-1946 St. Petersburg the past four seasons. During that time, he played in 128 games and recorded 35 goals and 26 assists. Volkov is expected to play for the Syracuse Crunch in upcoming 2017–18 season.

July
On July 1, 2017, the Lightning announced it had signed prospect Oleg Sosunov to a three-year, entry-level contract. Sosunov was recently selected 39th overall in the 2017 Canadian Hockey League Import Draft by the Western Hockey League (WHL)'s Moose Jaw Warriors. Sosunov will be playing for the Warriors in the upcoming 2017–18 season.

The Lightning acquired forward Carter Verhaeghe from the New York Islanders in exchange for goaltender Kristers Gudlevskis. Verhaeghe is a former third-round pick of the Toronto Maple Leafs. Verhaeghe appeared in 45 games with the AHL's Bridgeport Sound Tigers, where he scored 16 goals and 13 assists.

The Lightning announced the signing of goaltender Michael Leighton to a one-year, two-way contract. Leighton played in four games with the Carolina Hurricanes this past season. Leighton also spent time with the Hurricanes' AHL affiliate, the Charlotte Checkers, where he played in 23 games. He had a record of 11–7–3 in those games, along with a 2.17 goals-against average (GAA) and a .921 save percentage. Leighton is expected to start the season as the Syracuse Crunch's starting goaltender.

The Lightning announced the signing of defenseman Mat Bodie to a one-year, two-way contract. In 2016–17, Bodie played for both the AHL's Rochester Americans and Hartford Wolf Pack. His season totals were 10 goals and 39 points, both career highs.

The Lightning announced the signing of left wing Alex Gallant to a one-year, two-way contract. Gallant played in 29 games with the AHL's San Jose Barracuda in 2016–17, recording two assists. Gallant has also skated in 56 career AHL games, scoring one goal and two assists.

The Lightning announced it had signed defenseman Jamie McBain to a one-year, two-way contract. McBain spent the duration of the 2016–17 season with the Tucson Roadrunners. McBain is expected to provide Syracuse with a veteran presence, having played in 348 career NHL games.

The Lightning announced the free agent signing of defenseman Dan Girardi to a two-year contract valued at $3 million per season. Girardi had spent his entire career with the New York Rangers before signing with the Lightning. Girardi is a veteran of 788 career NHL games. During that span Girardi has scored 46 goals and 230 points.

The final signing announced by the Lightning was free agent left wing Chris Kunitz to a one-year contract was worth $2 million. Kunitz brings a plethora of playoff experience, having won four Stanley Cups. Kunitz's career has spanned 884 career NHL games where he has 250 goals and 580 points.

On July 10, 2017, the Lightning announced it had re-signed restricted free agent forward Tyler Johnson to a seven-year, $35 million contract extension. Johnson has spent his entire NHL career with the Lightning since signing with them as  undrafted free agent. Over five season Johnson has recorded 89 goals and 122 assists.

On July 14, 2017, the Lightning announced the re-signing of restricted free agent forward Ondrej Palat to a five-year, $26.5 million contract extension. Since being selected in the seventh round of the 2011 NHL Entry Draft, Palat has scored 74 goals and 144 assists over 307 games.

On July 18, 2017, the Lightning announced it had re-signed forward Michael Bournival to a one-year contract extension. In 2016–17, Bournival played in 19 games with the Lightning last season and 38 with the Crunch. In his career, Bournival has played in 108 career NHL games where he has recorded 12 goals and 22 points.

August
On August 17, 2017, the Lightning announced it had re-signed forward Tye McGinn to a one-year, two-way contract. McGinn was limited to just 21 games in 2016–17 due to an injury. He recorded 10 goals and 19 points.

On August 29, 2017, the Lightning announced its annual prospect tournament roster. Prospects of note in attendance are Brett Howden, Callan Foote, Mikhail Sergachev, Taylor Raddysh, and Anthony Cirelli. Also of note, the younger brother of Lightning forward Cory Conacher, Shane Conacher, is attending as an invitee. The prospect tournament will take place at Germain Arena, which is located in Estero, Florida. The other teams participating in the tournament are the Florida Panthers, the Nashville Predators and Washington Capitals. The tournament is set to run from September 9 to 12, inclusive.

Training camp

September
On September 6, 2017, the Lightning announced the annual prospect tournament had been canceled due to Hurricane Irma. The Lightning opted to play the Nashville Predators' prospects in a series of scrimmages over three days at Ford Ice Center in Antioch, Tennessee.

On September 13, 2017, the Lightning announced its 63-man roster for training camp. There were six training camp invitees this year, which were Shane Conacher, Kevin Hancock, Kevin Lynch, Reid McNeill, Joseph Raaymakers and Nicola Riopel. The roster also features all the prospects that participated in the scrimmages with the Predators the prior weekend.

On September 18, 2017, Brian Hart and Cameron Darcy both cleared unconditional waivers. This terminated the remaining year on both players contract, which frees up two contracts as part of the team's 50-contract limit.
On September 20, 2017, the Lightning announced the first round of players cut from their training camp roster. Kevin Hancock and Joseph Raaymakers were released from their tryout agreements. Alexey Lipanov, Christopher Paquette, Taylor Raddysh, Christopher Paquette and Oleg Sosunov were reassigned to their respective junior clubs.

On September 21, 2017, the Lightning announced that it had trimmed down its training camp roster by three players. Boris Katchouk, Callan Foote and Libor Hajek were assigned to their junior clubs for the upcoming season.

On September 23, 2017, the Lightning made another round of roster cuts, which reduced the training camp roster to 44 players. Shane Conacher, Kevin Lynch, Reid McNeill were released from their tryout agreements. Otto Somppi was assigned to the Quebec Major Junior Hockey League (QMJHL)'s Halifax Mooseheads. Alex Gallant, Carter Verhaghe, Mat Bodie, Matthew Spencer, Connor Ingram and Michael Leighton were assigned to the Syracuse Crunch.

On September 25, 2017, the Lightning announced it was retiring Vincent Lecavalier's number 4 jersey on February 10, 2018. The retirement ceremony will take place before the game against the Los Angeles Kings, the club Lecavalier finished his career with. That same day, the Lightning announced it had reduced its training camp roster down to 30 players. Former first round pick Brett Howden was assigned to his junior club in the WHL, while Anthony Cirelli, Adam Erne, Mathieu Joseph, Tye McGinn, Matthew Peca, Mitchell Stephens, Dennis Yan, Erik Cernak, Jamie McBain, Ben Thomas and Daniel Walcott were reassigned to Syracuse.

On September 28, 2017, the Lightning announced it had signed forward prospect Alexy Lipanov to a three-year, entry-level contract.

On September 29, 2017, the Lightning announced it had reduced its training camp roster by one player: Alexander Volkov, the Lightning's 2017 second-round draft pick, was reassigned to Syracuse.

October
On October 1, 2017, the Lightning announced that it had reassigned goaltender Nicola Riopel to the Adirondack Thunder of the ECHL.

On October 2, 2017, the Lightning placed on Cory Conacher on waivers for the purpose of reassigning him to the Crunch. Conacher was the final roster cut of training camp. The Lightning will started the season with thirteen forwards and eight defensemen. The forward group consisted of J. T. Brown, Ryan Callahan, Gabriel Dumont, Yanni Gourde, Tyler Johnson, Alex Killorn, Nikita Kucherov, Chris Kunitz, Vladislav Namestnikov, Ondrej Palat, Cedric Paquette, Brayden Point and Steven Stamkos. The defensemen on the opening night roster were Braydon Coburn, Jake Dotchin, Dan Girardi, Victor Hedman, Slater Koekkoek, Mikhail Sergachev, Anton Stralman and Andrej Sustr. Forwards Michael Bournival, Erik Condra, Jonne Tammela, Carter Verhaeghe and defenseman Dominik Masin remained with the team on injured reserve.

Standings

Schedule and results

Preseason

|- align="center" bgcolor="ffcccc"
| 1 || September 19 || Carolina Hurricanes || 1–2 ||  || Leighton || Amalie Arena || 11,454 || 0–1–0 || 
|- align="center" bgcolor="ccffcc"
| 2 || September 20 || @ Carolina Hurricanes || 4–3 ||  || Leighton || PNC Arena || 6,486 || 1–1–0 || 
|- align="center" bgcolor="ccffcc"
| 3 || September 22 || Nashville Predators || 3–1 ||  || Vasilevskiy || Amalie Arena || 15,504 || 2–1–0 || 
|- align="center" bgcolor="ffcccc"
| 4 || September 24 || Florida Panthers || 2–4 ||  || Budaj || Amalie Arena || 12,911 || 2–2–0 || 
|- align="center" bgcolor="ffcccc"
| 5 || September 26 || @ Florida Panthers || 2–4 ||  || Vasilevskiy || BB&T Center || 8,242 || 2–3–0 || 
|- align="center" bgcolor="ffcccc"
| 6 || September 28 || @ Florida Panthers || 2–5 ||  || Budaj || BB&T Center || 13,279 || 2–4–0 || 
|- align="center" bgcolor="ccffcc"
| 7 || September 30 || @ Nashville Predators || 3–2 || OT || Vasilevskiy || Bridgestone Arena || 17,133 || 3–4–0 || 
|-

|-
| Lightning score listed first;

Regular season

|- align="center" bgcolor="ccffcc"
| 1 || October 6 || Florida Panthers || 5–3 ||  || Vasilevskiy || Amalie Arena || 19,092 || 1–0–0 || 2 || 
|- align="center" bgcolor="ffcccc"
| 2 || October 7 || @ Florida Panthers || 4–5 ||  || Vasilevskiy || BB&T Center || 16,871 || 1–1–0 || 2 || 
|- align="center" bgcolor="ccffcc"
| 3 || October 9 || Washington Capitals || 4–3 || OT || Vasilevskiy || Amalie Arena || 19,092 || 2–1–0 || 4 || 
|- align="center" bgcolor="ccffcc"
| 4 || October 12 || Pittsburgh Penguins || 5–4 ||  || Vasilevskiy || Amalie Arena || 19,092 || 3–1–0 || 6 || 
|- align="center" bgcolor="ccffcc"
| 5 || October 14 || St. Louis Blues || 2–1 ||  || Vasilevskiy || Amalie Arena || 19,092 || 4–1–0 || 8 || 
|- align="center" bgcolor="ccffcc"
| 6 || October 16 || @ Detroit Red Wings || 3–2 ||  || Vasilevskiy || Little Caesars Arena || 19,515 || 5–1–0 || 10 || 
|- align="center" bgcolor="B0C4DE"
| 7 || October 17 || @ New Jersey Devils || 4–5 || SO || Budaj || Prudential Center || 13,176 || 5–1–1 || 11 || 
|- align="center" bgcolor="ccffcc"
| 8 || October 19 || @ Columbus Blue Jackets || 2–0 ||  || Vasilevskiy || Nationwide Arena || 13,155 || 6–1–1 || 13 || 
|- align="center" bgcolor="ccffcc"
| 9 || October 21 || Pittsburgh Penguins || 7–1 ||  || Vasilevskiy || Amalie Arena || 19,092 || 7–1–1 || 15 || 
|- align="center" bgcolor="ccffcc"
| 10 || October 24 || @ Carolina Hurricanes || 5–1 ||  || Vasilevskiy || PNC Arena || 10,498 || 8–1–1 || 17 || 
|- align="center" bgcolor="ccffcc"
| 11 || October 26 || Detroit Red Wings || 3–2 ||  || Vasilevskiy || Amalie Arena || 19,092 || 9–1–1 || 19 || 
|- align="center" bgcolor="ffcccc"
| 12 || October 28 || Anaheim Ducks || 1–4 ||  || Budaj || Amalie Arena || 19,092 || 9–2–1 || 19 || 
|- align="center" bgcolor="ccffcc"
| 13 || October 30 || @ Florida Panthers || 8–5 ||  || Vasilevskiy || BB&T Center || 9,493 || 10–2–1 || 21 || 
|-

|- align="center" bgcolor="B0C4DE"
| 14 || November 2 || New York Rangers || 1–2 || OT || Vasilevskiy || Amalie Arena || 19,092 || 10–2–2 || 22 || 
|- align="center" bgcolor="ccffcc"
| 15 || November 4 || Columbus Blue Jackets || 5–4 || SO || Vasilevskiy || Amalie Arena || 19,092 || 11–2–2 || 24 ||  
|- align="center" bgcolor="ccffcc"
| 16 || November 8 || @ San Jose Sharks || 5–1 ||  || Vasilevskiy || SAP Center || 17,044 || 12–2–2 || 26 || 
|- align="center" bgcolor="ccffcc"
| 17 || November 9 || @ Los Angeles Kings || 5–2 ||  || Budaj || Staples Center || 18,230 || 13–2–2 || 28 || 
|- align="center" bgcolor="ccffcc"
| 18 || November 12 || @ Anaheim Ducks || 2–1 ||  || Vasilevskiy || Honda Center || 15,707 || 14–2–2 || 30 || 
|- align="center" bgcolor="ccffcc"
| 19 || November 16 || Dallas Stars || 6–1 ||  || Vasilevskiy || Amalie Arena || 19,092 || 15–2–2 || 32 || 
|- align="center" bgcolor="ffcccc"
| 20 || November 18 || New York Islanders || 3–5 ||  || Vasilevskiy || Amalie Arena || 19,092 || 15–3–2 || 32 || 
|- align="center" bgcolor="ccffcc"
| 21 || November 22 || Chicago Blackhawks || 3–2 || OT || Vasilevskiy || Amalie Arena || 19,092 || 16–3–2 || 34 || 
|- align="center" bgcolor="ffcccc"
| 22 || November 24 || @ Washington Capitals || 1–3 ||  || Vasilevskiy || Capital One Arena || 18,506 || 16–4–2 || 34 || 
|- align="center" bgcolor="ffcccc"
| 23 || November 25 || @ Pittsburgh Penguins || 2–5 ||  || Budaj || PPG Paints Arena || 18,659 || 16–5–2 || 34 || 
|- align="center" bgcolor="ccffcc"
| 24 || November 28 || @ Buffalo Sabres || 2–0 ||  || Vasilevskiy || KeyBank Center || 17,569 || 17–5–2 || 36 || 
|- align="center" bgcolor="ffcccc"
| 25 || November 29 || @ Boston Bruins || 2–3 ||  || Vasilevskiy || TD Garden || 17,565 || 17–6–2 || 36 || 
|-

|- align="center" bgcolor="ccffcc"
| 26 || December 2 || San Jose Sharks || 5–2 ||  || Vasilevskiy || Amalie Arena || 19,092 || 18–6–2 || 38 || 
|- align="center" bgcolor="ccffcc"
| 27 || December 5 || New York Islanders || 6–2 ||  || Vasilevskiy || Amalie Arena || 19,092 || 19–6–2 || 40 || 
|- align="center" bgcolor="ccffcc"
| 28 || December 7 || Colorado Avalanche || 5–2 ||  || Budaj || Amalie Arena || 19,092 || 20–6–2 || 42 || 
|- align="center" bgcolor="ccffcc"
| 29 || December 9 || Winnipeg Jets || 4–3 || OT || Vasilevskiy || Amalie Arena || 19,092 || 21–6–2 || 44 || 
|- align="center" bgcolor="ccffcc"
| 30 || December 12 || @ St. Louis Blues || 3–0 ||  || Vasilevskiy || Scottrade Center || 18,290 || 22–6–2 || 46 || 
|- align="center" bgcolor="ccffcc"
| 31 || December 14 || @ Arizona Coyotes || 4–1 ||  || Vasilevskiy || Gila River Arena || 11,591 || 23–6–2 || 48 || 
|- align="center" bgcolor="ccffcc"
| 32 || December 16 || @ Colorado Avalanche || 6–5 ||  || Budaj || Pepsi Center || 16,956 || 24–6–2 || 50 || 
|- align="center" bgcolor="ffcccc"
| 33 || December 19 || @ Vegas Golden Knights || 3–4 ||  || Vasilevskiy || T-Mobile Arena || 17,813 || 24–7–2 || 50 || 
|- align="center" bgcolor="ccffcc"
| 34 || December 21 || Ottawa Senators || 4–3 || SO || Vasilevskiy || Amalie Arena || 19,092 || 25–7–2 || 52 || 
|- align="center" bgcolor="ccffcc"
| 35 || December 23 || Minnesota Wild || 3–0 ||  || Vasilevskiy || Amalie Arena || 19,092 || 26–7–2 || 54 || 
|- align="center" bgcolor="ccffcc"
| 36 || December 28 || Montreal Canadiens || 3–1 ||  || Vasilevskiy || Amalie Arena || 19,092 || 27–7–2 || 56 || 
|- align="center" bgcolor="ffcccc"
| 37 || December 29 || Philadelphia Flyers || 3–5 ||  || Budaj || Amalie Arena || 19,092 || 27–8–2 || 56 || 
|- align="center" bgcolor="ccffcc"
| 38 || December 31 || @ Columbus Blue Jackets || 5–0 ||  || Vasilevskiy || Nationwide Arena || 18,878 || 28–8–2 || 58 || 
|-

|- align="center" bgcolor="ccffcc"
| 39 || January 2 || @ Toronto Maple Leafs || 2–0 ||  || Vasilevskiy || Air Canada Centre || 19,344 || 29–8–2 || 60 || 
|- align="center" bgcolor="B0C4DE"
| 40 || January 4 || @ Montreal Canadiens || 1–2 || SO || Vasilevskiy || Bell Centre || 21,302 || 29–8–3 || 61 || 
|- align="center" bgcolor="ffcccc"
| 41 || January 6 || @ Ottawa Senators || 3–6 ||  || Vasilevskiy || Canadian Tire Centre || 16,247 || 29–9–3 || 61 || 
|- align="center" bgcolor="ccffcc"
| 42 || January 7 || @ Detroit Red Wings || 5–2 ||  || Domingue || Little Caesars Arena || 19,515 || 30–9–3 || 63 || 
|- align="center" bgcolor="ccffcc"
| 43 || January 9 || Carolina Hurricanes || 5–4 ||  || Vasilevskiy || Amalie Arena || 19,092 || 31–9–3 || 65 || 
|- align="center" bgcolor="ffcccc"
| 44 || January 11 || Calgary Flames || 1–5 ||  || Vasilevskiy || Amalie Arena || 19,092 || 31–10–3 || 65 || 
|- align="center" bgcolor="ffcccc"
| 45 || January 18 || Vegas Golden Knights || 1–4 ||  || Vasilevskiy || Amalie Arena || 19,092 || 31–11–3 || 65 || 
|- align="center" bgcolor="ffcccc"
| 46 || January 20 || @ Minnesota Wild || 2–5 ||  || Vasilevskiy || Xcel Energy Center || 19,007 || 31–12–3 || 65 || 
|- align="center" bgcolor="ccffcc"
| 47 || January 22 || @ Chicago Blackhawks || 2–0 ||  || Vasilevskiy || United Center || 21,662 || 32–12–3 || 67 || 
|- align="center" bgcolor="ccffcc"
| 48 || January 23 || @ Nashville Predators || 4–3 || OT || Domingue || Bridgestone Arena || 17,332 || 33–12–3 || 69 || 
|- align="center" bgcolor="ccffcc"
| 49 || January 25 || @ Philadelphia Flyers || 5–1 ||  || Vasilevskiy || Wells Fargo Center || 19,489 || 34–12–3 || 71 || 
|- align="center" bgcolor="bbbbbb"
| colspan="11"|All-Star Break (January 26–29)
|- align="center" bgcolor="ffcccc"
| 50 || January 30 || @ Winnipeg Jets || 1–3 ||  || Domingue || Bell MTS Place || 15,321 || 34–13–3 || 71 || 
|-

|- align="center" bgcolor="ccffcc"
| 51 || February 1 || @ Calgary Flames || 7–4 ||  || Vasilevskiy || Scotiabank Saddledome || 19,000 || 35–13–3 || 73 || 
|- align="center" bgcolor="ccffcc"
| 52 || February 3 || @ Vancouver Canucks || 4–2 ||  || Vasilevskiy || Rogers Arena || 18,865 || 36–13–3 || 75 || 
|- align="center" bgcolor="ffcccc"
| 53 || February 5 || @ Edmonton Oilers || 2–6 ||  || Vasilevskiy || Rogers Place || 18,347 || 36–14–3 || 75 || 
|- align="center" bgcolor="ccffcc"
| 54 || February 8 || Vancouver Canucks || 5–2 ||  || Vasilevskiy || Amalie Arena || 19,092 || 37–14–3 || 77 || 
|- align="center" bgcolor="ccffcc"
| 55 || February 10 || Los Angeles Kings || 4–3 ||  || Vasilevskiy || Amalie Arena || 19,092 || 38–14–3 || 79 || 
|- align="center" bgcolor="ffcccc"
| 56 || February 12 || @ Toronto Maple Leafs || 3–4 ||  || Vasilevskiy || Air Canada Centre || 19,112 || 38–15–3 || 79 || 
|- align="center" bgcolor="ffcccc"
| 57 || February 13 || @ Buffalo Sabres || 3–5 ||  || Domingue || KeyBank Center || 16,530 || 38–16–3 || 79 || 
|- align="center" bgcolor="ccffcc"
| 58 || February 15 || Detroit Red Wings || 4–1 ||  || Vasilevskiy || Amalie Arena || 19,092 || 39–16–3 || 81 || 
|- align="center" bgcolor="ffcccc"
| 59 || February 17 || New Jersey Devils || 3–4 ||  || Vasilevskiy || Amalie Arena || 19,092 || 39–17–3 || 81 || 
|- align="center" bgcolor="ccffcc"
| 60 || February 20 || @ Washington Capitals || 4–2 ||  || Vasilevskiy || Capital One Arena || 18,506 || 40–17–3 || 83 || 
|- align="center" bgcolor="ccffcc"
| 61 || February 22 || @ Ottawa Senators || 4–3 ||  || Domingue || Canadian Tire Centre || 16,204 || 41–17–3 || 85 || 
|- align="center" bgcolor="ccffcc"
| 62 || February 24 || @ Montreal Canadiens || 4–3 || SO || Vasilevskiy || Bell Centre || 21,203 || 42–17–3 || 87 || 
|- align="center" bgcolor="ccffcc"
| 63 || February 26 || Toronto Maple Leafs || 4–3 || SO || Vasilevskiy || Amalie Arena || 19,092 || 43–17–3 || 89 || 
|- align="center" bgcolor="B0C4DE"
| 64 || February 28 || Buffalo Sabres || 1–2 || OT || Vasilevskiy || Amalie Arena || 19,092 || 43–17–4 || 90 || 
|-

|- align="center" bgcolor="ccffcc"
| 65 || March 1 || @ Dallas Stars || 5–4 || OT || Domingue || American Airlines Center || 17,337 || 44–17–4 || 92 || 
|- align="center" bgcolor="ccffcc"
| 66 || March 3 || Philadelphia Flyers || 7–6 || SO || Vasilevskiy || Amalie Arena || 19,092 || 45–17–4 || 94 || 
|- align="center" bgcolor="ccffcc"
| 67 || March 6 || Florida Panthers || 5–4 || OT || Vasilevskiy || Amalie Arena || 19,092 || 46–17–4 || 96 || 
|- align="center" bgcolor="ccffcc"
| 68 || March 8 || New York Rangers || 5–3 ||  || Vasilevskiy || Amalie Arena || 19,092 || 47–17–4 || 98 || 
|- align="center" bgcolor="ccffcc"
| 69 || March 10 || Montreal Canadiens || 3–2 || SO || Domingue || Amalie Arena || 19,092 || 48–17–4 || 100 || 
|- align="center" bgcolor="ffcccc"
| 70 || March 13 || Ottawa Senators || 4–7 ||  || Vasilevskiy || Amalie Arena || 19,092 || 48–18–4 || 100 || 
|- align="center" bgcolor="ffcccc"
| 71 || March 17 || Boston Bruins || 0–3 ||  || Vasilevskiy || Amalie Arena || 19,092 || 48–19–4 || 100 || 
|- align="center" bgcolor="ccffcc"
| 72 || March 18 || Edmonton Oilers || 3–1 ||  || Domingue || Amalie Arena || 19,092 || 49–19–4 || 102 || 
|- align="center" bgcolor="ccffcc"
| 73 || March 20 || Toronto Maple Leafs || 4–3 ||  || Vasilevskiy || Amalie Arena || 19,092 || 50–19–4 || 104 || 
|- align="center" bgcolor="ccffcc"
| 74 || March 22 || @ New York Islanders || 7–6 ||  || Vasilevskiy || Barclays Center || 10,354 || 51–19–4 || 106 || 
|- align="center" bgcolor="ffcccc"
| 75 || March 24 || @ New Jersey Devils || 1–2 ||  || Vasilevskiy || Prudential Center || 16,514 || 51–20–4 || 106 || 
|- align="center" bgcolor="ffcccc"
| 76 || March 26 || Arizona Coyotes || 1–4 ||  || Domingue || Amalie Arena || 19,092 || 51–21–4 || 106 || 
|- align="center" bgcolor="ffcccc"
| 77 || March 29 || @ Boston Bruins || 2–4 ||  || Vasilevskiy || TD Garden || 17,565 || 51–22–4 || 106 || 
|- align="center" bgcolor="ccffcc"
| 78 || March 30 || @ New York Rangers || 7–3 ||  || Domingue || Madison Square Garden || 18,006 || 52–22–4 || 108 || 
|-

|- align="center" bgcolor="ffcccc"
| 79 || April 1 || Nashville Predators || 1–4 ||  || Vasilevskiy || Amalie Arena || 19,092 || 52–23–4 || 108 || 
|- align="center" bgcolor="ccffcc"
| 80 || April 3 || Boston Bruins || 4–0 ||  || Vasilevskiy || Amalie Arena || 19,092 || 53–23–4 || 110 || 
|- align="center" bgcolor="ccffcc"
| 81 || April 6 || Buffalo Sabres || 7–5 ||  || Vasilevskiy || Amalie Arena || 19,092 || 54–23–4 || 112 || 
|- align="center" bgcolor="B0C4DE"
| 82 || April 7 || @ Carolina Hurricanes || 2–3 || OT || Domingue || PNC Arena || 15,402 || 54–23–5 || 113 || 
|-

|-
| Lightning score listed first;

Playoffs

|- align="center" bgcolor="ccffcc"
| 1 || April 12 || New Jersey Devils || 5–2 ||  || Vasilevskiy || Amalie Arena || 19,092 || 1–0 || 
|- align="center" bgcolor="ccffcc"
| 2 || April 14 || New Jersey Devils || 5–3 ||  || Vasilevskiy || Amalie Arena || 19,092 || 2–0 || 
|- align="center" bgcolor="ffcccc"
| 3 || April 16 || @ New Jersey Devils || 2–5 ||  || Vasilevskiy || Prudential Center || 16,514 || 2–1 || 
|- align="center" bgcolor="ccffcc"
| 4 || April 18 || @ New Jersey Devils || 3–1 ||  || Vasilevskiy || Prudential Center || 16,514 || 3–1 || 
|- align="center" bgcolor="ccffcc"
| 5 || April 21 || New Jersey Devils || 3–1 ||  || Vasilevskiy || Amalie Arena || 19,092 || 4–1 ||   
|-

|- align="center" bgcolor="ffcccc"
| 1 || April 28 || Boston Bruins || 2–6 ||  || Vasilevskiy || Amalie Arena || 19,092 || 0–1 || 
|- align="center" bgcolor="ccffcc"
| 2 || April 30 || Boston Bruins || 4–2 ||  || Vasilevskiy || Amalie Arena || 19,092 || 1–1 || 
|- align="center" bgcolor="ccffcc"
| 3 || May 2 || @ Boston Bruins || 4–1 ||  || Vasilevskiy || TD Garden || 17,565 || 2–1 || 
|- align="center" bgcolor="ccffcc"
| 4 || May 4 || @ Boston Bruins || 4–3 || OT || Vasilevskiy || TD Garden || 17,565 || 3–1 || 
|- align="center" bgcolor="ccffcc"
| 5 || May 6 || Boston Bruins || 3–1 ||  || Vasilevskiy|| Amalie Arena || 19,092 || 4–1 || 
|-

|- align="center" bgcolor="ffcccc"
| 1 || May 11 || Washington Capitals || 2–4 ||  || Vasilevskiy || Amalie Arena || 19,092 || 0–1 || 
|- align="center" bgcolor="ffcccc"
| 2 || May 13 || Washington Capitals || 2–6 ||  || Vasilevskiy || Amalie Arena || 19,092 || 0–2 || 
|- align="center" bgcolor="ccffcc"
| 3 || May 15 || @ Washington Capitals || 4–2 ||  || Vasilevskiy || Capital One Arena || 18,506 || 1–2 || 
|- align="center" bgcolor="ccffcc"
| 4 || May 17 || @ Washington Capitals || 4–2 ||  || Vasilevskiy || Capital One Arena || 18,506 || 2–2 || 
|- align="center" bgcolor="ccffcc"
| 5 || May 19 || Washington Capitals || 3–2 ||  || Vasilevskiy || Amalie Arena || 19,092 || 3–2 || 
|- align="center" bgcolor="ffcccc"
| 6 || May 21 || @ Washington Capitals || 0–3 ||  || Vasilevskiy || Capital One Arena || 18,506 || 3–3 || 
|- align="center" bgcolor="ffcccc"
| 7 || May 23 || Washington Capitals || 0–4 ||  || Vasilevskiy || Amalie Arena || 19,092 || 3–4 || 
|-

|-
| Lightning score listed first;

Player stats
May 23, 2018

Skaters

Goaltenders

†Denotes player spent time with another team before joining Tampa Bay.  Stats reflect time with Tampa Bay only.
‡Traded from Tampa Bay mid-season.
Bold/italics denotes franchise record

Suspensions/fines

Awards and honours

Awards

Milestones

Transactions
The Lightning have been involved in the following transactions during the 2017–18 season.

Trades

Free agents acquired

Free agents lost

Players released

Claimed via waivers

Lost via waivers

Lost via retirement

Player signings

Draft picks

Below are the Tampa Bay Lightning' selections at the 2017 NHL Entry Draft, which was held on June 23 and 24, 2017, at the United Center in Chicago, Illinois.

Draft notes:
 The Toronto Maple Leafs' second-round pick went to the Tampa Bay Lightning as the result of a trade on February 27, 2017 that sent Brian Boyle to Toronto in exchange for Byron Froese and this pick (being conditional at the time of the trade).

References

Tampa Bay Lightning seasons
Tampa Bay Lightning
Tampa Bay Lightning
Tampa Bay Lightning
National Hockey League All-Star Game hosts